Events in 1945 in animation.

Events

January 
 January 6: Chuck Jones' Odor-able Kitty premieres, produced by Warner Bros. Cartoons which marks the debut of the French skunk Pepé Le Pew.
 January 13:
 Friz Freleng's Bugs Bunny cartoon Herr Meets Hare premieres, produced by Warner Bros. Cartoons, a war-time propaganda short in which Bugs outsmarts both Hermann Göring and Adolf Hitler.
 Tex Avery's Screwy Squirrel cartoon The Screwy Truant premieres, produced by MGM.

February 
 February 10: Frank Tashlin's Bugs Bunny short The Unruly Hare premieres, produced by Warner Bros. Cartoons.

March 
 March 3: Tex Avery's Droopy cartoon The Shooting of Dan McGoo premieres, produced by MGM.
 March 15: 17th Academy Awards: The Tom & Jerry short Mouse Trouble by William Hanna and Joseph Barbera, produced by MGM, wins the Academy Award for Best Animated Short Film.
 March 24: Friz Freleng's Merrie Melodies short Life with Feathers, premieres. It marks the debut of Sylvester the Cat.

April 
 April 7: Tex Avery's Jerky Turkey premieres, produced by MGM.
 April 12: The first Japanese feature-length animated film, a war-time propaganda cartoon called Momotaro: Sacred Sailors, directed by Mitsuyo Seo, is first released.

May 
 May 5:
 Friz Freleng's Bugs Bunny and Yosemite Sam cartoon Hare Trigger premieres, produced by Warner Bros. Cartoons.
 William Hanna and Joseph Barbera's Tom & Jerry short The Mouse Comes to Dinner premieres, produced by MGM.
 May 7: Bob Clampett leaves Warner Bros. Cartoons to pursue a career in television.
 May 19: Friz Freleng's Daffy Duck cartoon Ain't That Ducky premieres, produced by Warner Bros. Cartoons.

June 
 June 9: Bob Clampett's Tweety cartoon A Gruesome Twosome premieres, produced by Warner Bros. Cartoons.
 June 21: William Hanna and Joseph Barbera's Tom & Jerry cartoon Tee for Two premieres, produced by Warner Bros. Animation.
 June 22: The Halas and Batchelor cartoon Handling Ships, a training film for the Royal Navy, premieres, being the first British animated film in Technicolor.
 June 29: Jack King's Donald Duck short Donald's Crime premieres, produced by Walt Disney Animation Studios.
 June 30: Frank Tashlin's Tale of Two Mice premieres, produced by Warner Bros. Cartoons.

July 
 July 7: William Hanna and Joseph Barbera's Tom & Jerry short Mouse in Manhattan premieres, produced by MGM.
 July 28: Bob Clampett's Porky Pig cartoon Wagon Heels premieres, produced by Warner Bros. Cartoons.

August 
 August 10: Jack Kinney's Donald Duck cartoon Duck Pimples premieres, produced by Walt Disney Animation Studios.
 August 11: Chuck Jones' Hare Conditioned premieres, produced by Warner Bros. Cartoons.
 August 25: Tex Avery's Swing Shift Cinderella premieres, produced by MGM.

September 
 September 7: Jack Hannah's Donald Duck and Goofy cartoon No Sail, produced by the Walt Disney Company, premieres.
 September 15: Bob Clampett's The Bashful Buzzard premieres, produced by Warner Bros. Cartoons.
 September 21: Jack Kinney's Goofy cartoon Hockey Homicide, produced by the Walt Disney Company, premieres.

October 
 October 15: The first issue of the Dutch comics magazine Stripfilm is published. It also offers information about animation techniques, provided by the animation studio Stripfilm. The magazine will last until 23 November.
 October 26: Jack King's Donald Duck cartoon Cured Duck premieres, produced by Walt Disney Animation.

November 
 November 3: Tex Avery's Droopy cartoon Wild and Woolfy premieres, produced by MGM.
 November 10: Chuck Jones' Bugs Bunny and Elmer Fudd cartoon Hare Tonic premieres, produced by Warner Bros. Cartoons.
 November 16: Isadore Sparber's The Friendly Ghost premieres, produced by Famous Studios, in which Casper the Friendly Ghost makes his debut.
 November 23: The Spanish animated film Garbancito de la Mancha by José María Blay and Arturo Moreno premieres.Joaquín Bisbe

December 
 December 1: Frank Tashlin's Daffy Duck short Nasty Quacks premieres, produced by Warner Bros. Cartoons.
 December 22: William Hanna and Joseph Barbera's Tom & Jerry short Quiet Please! premieres, produced by MGM.

Specific date unknown 
 The Soviet animated feature film The Lost Letter by Lamis Bredis and the Brumberg sisters premieres.
 Karel Zeman and Bořivoj Zeman's A Christmas Dream premieres.

Films released

 January 1 - The Lost Letter (Soviet Union)
 April 12 - Momotaro: Sacred Sailors (Japan)
 June 22 - Handling Ships (United Kingdom)
 November 23 - The Enchanted Sword (Spain)

Births

January
 January 9: Richard Lorenzana, American production accountant (The Simpsons, Futurama, Napoleon Dynamite), (d. 2014).
 January 12: Barrington Bunce, English-born American animator (Hanna-Barbera, Spider-Woman, Ruby-Spears Enterprises, Garbage Pail Kids, The Simpsons), storyboard artist (Dink, the Little Dinosaur, Marvel Productions, Hanna-Barbera, Wild West C.O.W.-Boys of Moo Mesa, Red Planet, Freakazoid!, Adventures in Odyssey, Nickelodeon Animation Studio, Butt Ugly Martians, Make Way for Noddy, Danger Rangers), character designer (ChalkZone) and art director (Alvin and the Chipmunks), (d. 2005).
 January 22: Steve Vinovich, American actor (voice of Puffin in The Swan Princess franchise, Maurice/Ranger in The Trumpet of the Swan, Park Ranger in Alpha and Omega).
 January 29: Tom Selleck, American actor (voice of Cornelius Robinson in Meet the Robinsons).

February
 February 2: Maxwell Becraft, Canadian animator (Warner Bros. Animation, The Super Mario Bros. Super Show!, He-Man and the Masters of the Universe, Bucky O'Hare and the Toad Wars, Attack of the Killer Tomatoes, Duckman, Muppet Babies, Sonic the Hedgehog, X-Men), (d. 2007).
 February 4: Tony Haygarth, English actor (voice of Mr. Tweedy in Chicken Run), (d. 2017).
 February 9: Mia Farrow, American actress (voice of the title characters in The Last Unicorn and Sarah, portrayed Daisy Suchot in Arthur and the Invisibles, Arthur and the Revenge of Maltazard, and Arthur 3: The War of the Two Worlds).
 February 20:
 Henry Polic II, American actor (voice of Jonathan Crane / Scarecrow in Batman: The Animated Series, Baba Looey in Yo Yogi!, Tracker Smurf in The Smurfs), (d. 2013).
 Brion James, American actor (voice of Rudy Jones / Parasite in Superman: The Animated Series), (d. 1999).
 February 23: Lynn Spees, American animator (The Secret of NIMH, FernGully: The Last Rainforest), (d. 2021).

March
 March 2: Donald Kushner, American producer (Animalympics, Tron, The Brave Little Toaster, Rover Dangerfield).
 March 8: Micky Dolenz, American actor, musician, television producer, businessman and member of The Monkees (voice of Skip Gilroy in The Funky Phantom, Wally in Butch Cassidy, Freddie the Fantastic and Scootch in Partridge Family 2200 A.D., Tod Devlin in Devlin, Willie Sheeler in The Skatebirds, Ralph and Scribble in The Secret Files of the Spy Dogs, Wendell the Love Grub in the Mighty Magiswords episode "The Saga of Robopiggeh!", Min and Max in the Batman: The Animated Series episode "Two-Face: Part 2", first voice of Arthur in The Tick).
 March 18: Susan Tyrrell, American actress (narrator in Wizards), (d. 2012).
 March 31: Edwin Catmull, American computer scientist (co-founder of Pixar).

April
 April 2: Linda Hunt, American actress (voice of Grandmother Willow in Pocahontas and Pocahontas II: Journey to a New World).
 April 10: Shirley Walker, American composer and conductor (Warner Bros. Animation), (d. 2006).
 April 26: Richard Doyle, American actor (voice of Enoch in Ben 10, Driscoll and Mr. Baumann in Ben 10: Ultimate Alien, Robert Kelly in Wolverine and the X-Men).

May
May 11: John Welson, Canadian animator (Special Delivery).

June
 June 11: Adrienne Barbeau, American actress (voice of Catwoman in the DC Animated Universe, Simone Lenoir in Scooby-Doo on Zombie Island, Helga Von Guggen in Totally Spies!).
 June 14: Marilyn Schreffler, American actress (voice of Brenda Chance in Captain Caveman and the Teen Angels, Daisy Mayhem in Scooby's All-Star Laff-A-Lympics, Wendy in Yogi's Space Race and Buford and the Galloping Ghost, Olive Oyl in The All New Popeye Hour, and Popeye and Son, Kuma in Pole Position, Winnie Werewolf in Scooby-Doo and the Ghoul School), (d. 1988).
 June 19: Marsha Kramer, American actress (additional voices in Antz, Ice Age, Jimmy Neutron: Boy Genius, The Simpsons Movie, The Lego Movie and The SpongeBob Movie: Sponge Out of Water), (d. 2020).

July
 July 6: Burt Ward, American actor, animal rights activist, and businessman (voice of Robin in The New Adventures of Batman, Batman: Return of the Caped Crusaders, Batman vs. Two-Face, and The Simpsons episode "Large Marge", young Barnacle Boy in the SpongeBob SquarePants episode "Back to the Past", himself in the Futurama episode "Leela and the Genestalk" and the Robot Chicken episode "Robot Chicken DC Comics Special III: Magical Friendship").
 July 10:
 Ron Glass, American actor (voice of Randy Carmichael in Rugrats and All Grown Up!, Dr. Lazenby in Recess: School's Out, Talking Baby in The Proud Family, Kwanseer in the Aladdin episode "Bad Mood Rising", News Anchorman in the Superman: The Animated Series episode "Blasts From The Past"), (d. 2016).
 Katsuji Mori, Japanese voice actor (voice of the title character in Mach GoGoGo).
 July 14: Maxine Waters Willard, American choir singer (choir performer in The Lion King, A Goofy Movie, Adventures from the Book of Virtues, The Lion King II: Simba's Pride, The Brave Little Toaster Goes to Mars and The Angry Beavers, additional voices in Brother Bear).
 July 19: George Dzundza, German-born American actor (voice of Ventriloquist in Batman: The Animated Series, Perry White in Superman: The Animated Series, Ivan Bloski in the Animaniacs episode "Plane Pals", Gustav Hovac in the Road Rovers episode "Where Rovers Dare").
 July 23: Edie McClurg, American actress (voice of Miss Right in The Secret of NIMH, Carlotta in The Little Mermaid franchise, Winnie Pig in Tiny Toon Adventures, Aunt Ruth Generic in Bobby's World, Mrs. Normanmeyer in The Addams Family, Fran in Higglytown Heroes, Ora Anderson in Life with Louie, Dr. Flora in A Bug's Life, Peggy Jones in Scooby-Doo! Pirates Ahoy!, Mary in Wreck-It Ralph, Greta in Frozen, Mrs. Butterworth in Foodfight!, Vera Tennyson in the Ben 10: Omniverse episode "Clyde Five", herself in the Family Guy episode "Holly Bibble").
 July 26: Helen Mirren, English actress (voice of Nyra in Legend of the Guardians: The Owls of Ga'Hoole, Dean Hardscrabble in Monsters University).
 July 28: Jim Davis, American cartoonist, television producer, screenwriter and film producer (creator of Garfield).

August
 August 6: Lori Hanson, American ink & paint artist (Hanna-Barbera, Teenage Mutant Ninja Turtles, Life with Louie, Happily Ever After: Fairy Tales for Every Child), (d. 2022).
 August 14: Steve Martin, American actor, comedian, writer, producer and musician (portrayed Mr. Chairman in Looney Tunes: Back in Action, voice of Hotep in The Prince of Egypt, Captain Smek in Home, Ray Patterson in The Simpsons episode "Trash of the Titans").
 August 31: Tom Coppola, American animator (Hanna-Barbera, Filmation, The Simpsons, Tiny Toon Adventures, Taz-Mania), (d. 1996).

September
 September 6: Go Nagai, Japanese manga artist (Cutie Honey, Devilman, Mazinger Z).
 September 14: Geoff Levin, American rock musician, songwriter and composer (Street Sharks, Nickelodeon Animation Studio, Sabrina: The Animated Series, Jakers! The Adventures of Piggley Winks).
 September 16: Pat Stevens, American actress (second voice of Velma Dinkley in the Scooby-Doo franchise, additional voices in Dynomutt, Dog Wonder and Captain Caveman and the Teen Angels), (d. 2010).
 September 17: Bruce Spence, New Zealand-Australian actor (voice of Chum in Finding Nemo).
 September 19: Austin Roberts, American singer and songwriter (performed the songs in season 2 of Scooby-Doo Where Are You!).

October
 October 7: Michael Wallis, American journalist, popular historian, author and speaker (voice of Sheriff in the Cars franchise).
 October 8: William E. Martin, American actor (voice of Rock Man in The Point!, Nightmare King in Little Nemo: Adventures in Slumberland, Shredder in seasons 8 & 10 of Teenage Mutant Ninja Turtles, Samhain in The Real Ghostbusters), (d. 2016).
 October 13: Mike Young, Welsh-American producer (creator of SuperTed, co-founder of Mike Young Productions).
 October 18: Huell Howser, American television personality, actor, producer, writer and singer (voice of Backson in Winnie the Pooh, voiced himself in The Simpsons episode "Oh Brother, Where Bart Thou?"), (d. 2013).
 October 19: John Lithgow, American actor (voice of Alexander in The Country Mouse and the City Mouse: A Christmas Tale, Jean-Claude in Rugrats in Paris: The Movie, Lord Farquaad in Shrek, Maurice in The Jungle Bunch: The Movie, Augustus "Gus" Redfield in The Simpsons episode "Meat Is Murder", himself in The Simpsons episode "I'm Just a Girl Who Can't Say D'oh").
 October 22: Buzz Potamkin, American television producer and director (The Berenstain Bears, Teen Wolf, Cartoon All-Stars to the Rescue, Hanna-Barbera, Buster & Chauncey's Silent Night), (d. 2012).
 October 28: Csaba Varga, Hungarian animator and producer (founder of Varga Studio), (d. 2012).
 October 30: Henry Winkler, American actor, comedian, author, producer, and director (voice of Fonzie in The Fonz and the Happy Days Gang and Mork & Mindy/Laverne & Shirley/Fonz Hour, Norville in Clifford's Puppy Days, the Snowman in Penn Zero: Part-Time Hero, King Julien XII in All Hail King Julien, Keith in Scoob!, Fritz in Monsters at Work, Santa Claus in Puppy Dog Pals, Boris in Rugrats, Ramrod in The Simpsons episode "Take My Wife, Sleaze", Ambush Bug in the Batman: The Brave and the Bold episode "Mitefall!", Bailiff in the DuckTales episode "The Life and Crimes of Scrooge McDuck!", himself in the King of the Hill episode "A Rover Runs Through It" and the BoJack Horseman episode "Still Broken").
 October 31: Brian Doyle-Murray, American actor and comedian (voice of Captain K'nuckles in The Marvelous Misadventures of Flapjack, the Flying Dutchman in SpongeBob SquarePants, Coach Tiffany Gills in My Gym Partner's a Monkey, the Chief in Teamo Supremo, Mr. Twitchell in Frosty Returns).

November
 November 27: James Avery, American actor (voice of Shredder in Teenage Mutant Ninja Turtles, James Rhodes/War Machine in Iron Man and Spider-Man, Haroud Hazi Bin in Aladdin), (d. 2013).

December
 December 1: Bette Midler, American actress, comedian, singer and author (voice of Georgette in Oliver & Company, Grandmama in The Addams Family and The Addams Family 2, herself in The Simpsons episode "Krusty Gets Kancelled").
 December 13:
 Heather North, American actress (second voice of Daphne Blake in Scooby-Doo), (d. 2017).
 Kathy Garver, American actress (voice of Firestar in Spider-Man and His Amazing Friends, Miss America in Spider-Man).
 December 17: Ernie Hudson, American actor (voice of Atticus in Infinity Train, Bill Fowler in Transformers: Prime, Buddy in Puppy Dog Pals, Lucius Fox in Batman: Bad Blood, Cyborg in The Super Powers Team: Galactic Guardians, Security Guard in the Batman: The Animated Series episode "Joker's Wild", Professor Felix in the Superman: The Animated Series episode "Action Figures").
 December 25:
 Paul Willson, American actor (voice of Coach Kluge and Mr. Detweiler in Recess, Florist in The Simpsons episode "Some Enchanted Evening", additional voices in Lloyd in Space).
 Burt Medall, American animator (Hanna-Barbera, The Grinch Grinches the Cat in the Hat, Filmation, Peanuts specials, Calico Entertainment, Garfield and Friends), sheet timer (Disney Television Animation, My Scene: Masquerade Madness, The Land Before Time, Warner Bros. Animation, Transformers Prime, NFL Rush Zone, Hulk and the Agents of S.M.A.S.H.) and director (Mr. Bogus, Disney Television Animation), (d. 2022).
 December 27: Giovanni Romanini, Italian animator and comics artist, (d. 2020).
 December 30: Davy Jones, English actor, singer and member of The Monkees (portrayed himself in the SpongeBob SquarePants episode "SpongeBob SquarePants vs. The Big One", voice of Jim Hawkins in Treasure Island, the Artful Dodger in Oliver Twist, Nigel in the Phineas and Ferb episode "Meatloaf Surprise", himself in The New Scooby-Doo Movies episode "The Haunted Horseman of Hagglethorn Hall", and the Hey Arnold! episode "Fishing Trip"), (d. 2012).
 December 31: Vernon Wells, Australian actor (voice of Network Head in The Drawn Together Movie: The Movie!).

Specific date unknown
 George Arthur Bloom, American-born Canadian television writer and producer (PBS Kids, Marvel Productions, Sunbow Entertainment, Street Sharks, G.I. Joe Extreme, Street Fighter, Space Racers).

Deaths

February
 February 2: Seitaro Kitayama, Japanese animation director, dies at age 56-57.

March
 March 4: Lucille La Verne, American actress (voice of the Evil Queen in Snow White and the Seven Dwarfs), dies at age 72.

See also
List of anime by release date (1939–1945)

References

External links 
Animated works of the year, listed in the IMDb